John Aasen (March 5, 1890 – August 1, 1938) was an American silent film actor and sideshow performer who was one of the tallest actors in history.

Early life
Aasen was born on March 5, 1890, in Minneapolis, Minnesota. His mother, Kristi (Danielsen) from Rollag in Numedal, was an extremely tall Norwegian woman of around 2.20 m (almost 7 ft 3 inches) in height (latest information from September 2008, sets her height to 188 cm, almost 6 ft 2 inches). It is not certain who his father was, but according to Aasen's sister Evelyn (who died in 1988), his father was Alfred Aasen. When Aasen was 10 years old, he and his mother moved from Ridgeway, Iowa (where his uncle Sam/Sevre lived with his wife Cornelia) to Sheyenne, North Dakota with his two younger siblings. Aasen was a Freemason. He rose to the degree of Master Mason at Highland Park Lodge No. 382, Los Angeles on July 14, 1924.

When in Sheyenne, Aasen's mother operated a restaurant. He attended school and helped out in the family business. In 1902, Aasen's mother died. He was taken into many homes and families. When a family he was staying with started to operate a hotel in Leeds, North Dakota, he moved with them there. Aasen's growth started slowly. When he was confirmed in the Lutheran faith in Grandfield Lutheran Church near Sheyenne, North Dakota, he was the shortest in his class. According to some sources, Aasen was around 2.74 m or 8 feet, 11½ inches (which, if true, would make him even taller than Robert Wadlow, the tallest verified person in history). The Top 10 of Everything 2010 edition states his height at 8 feet, 9.7 inches (2.68 m).

True height
According to the 1978 edition of Guinness World Records he was only 7 feet (213.4 cm). Just before his death, at age 46, he was medically measured at 7 feet 0.9 inches, however he had lost some height due to age and could not stand completely straight anymore. In June 2008, Loma Linda University confirmed that the  skeleton they had in their collection was John Aasen.

Career
Aasen worked for Midway Chemical, a company based in St. Paul, in 1917–1918. After that, he worked in various shows, including Barnum & Bailey and C.A. Wortham's World's Best Shows.

The death of giant George Auger led to Aasen's working in the film Why Worry? (1923). Later, he acted in several other films like Bengal Tiger, Charlie Chan at the Circus, Growing Pains, Should Married Men Go Home?, Legionnaires in Paris, Two Flaming Youths, The Sting of Stings, Long Fliv the King and the Tod Browning film Freaks, in a small uncredited cameo appearance.

Death
Aasen died from pneumonia on August 1, 1938, at Mendocino State Hospital in Mendocino, California. His body was later shipped to Dr. Charles Humberd in Missouri for study and dissection. The skeleton was kept by the doctor, and eventually shipped to Loma Linda, California. Aasen's cremated soft parts were given a Masonic funeral at Forest Lawn Cemetery in Glendale, California.

Selected filmography
 Why Worry? (1923)
 Long Fliv the King (1926)
 Legionnaires in Paris (1927)
 Should Married Men Go Home? (1928)
 Bengal Tiger (1936)

See also
 List of tallest people

References

Further reading
 Olson, Julia, Our Heritage, 1883–1980, Sheyenne area., Sheyenne Historical Society, Sheyenne, N.D., 1980

External links

 
 
 Website dedicated to Johan Aasen

1890 births
1938 deaths
20th-century American male actors
American Freemasons
American male silent film actors
American people of Norwegian descent
Burials at Forest Lawn Memorial Park (Glendale)
Deaths from pneumonia in California
Male actors from Minnesota
People with gigantism